John Cook Venters (22 August 1910 – 1978) was a Scottish professional football inside right who played in the Scottish League for Morton. He also played in the Football League for Nottingham Forest and Thames.

Personal life 
Venters father Sandy and brothers Alex and Andrew were also footballers.

Career statistics

References 

Scottish footballers
Scottish expatriate footballers
1910 births
1978 deaths
Association football inside forwards
Scottish Football League players
English Football League players
People from Cowdenbeath
BSC Young Boys players
Preston North End F.C. players
Nottingham Forest F.C. players
Thames A.F.C. players
Greenock Morton F.C. players
Scottish expatriate sportspeople in Switzerland
Expatriate footballers in Switzerland